"River" is a song by New Zealand-Australian rock band Dragon, released in May 1988. It was released as a non-album single but later appeared on Dragon's compilation album, Snake Eyes on the Paradise Greatest Hits 1976–1989. The song peaked at number 81 on the Australian ARIA Singles Chart.

Track listing 
 "River" (12" Alluvial Mudmix) (Todd Hunter) - 6:32
 "River" (7" version) (Todd Hunter) - 3:34
 "Bottom to the Top" (Alan Mansfield, Marc Hunter, Todd Hunter) - 4:47

Charts

Personnel 
 Marc Hunter – vocals
 Todd Hunter – bass guitar, vocals
 Lee Borkman – keyboards
 John Watson – drums 
 Tommy Emmanuel – guitar
 Doane Perry – drums 
 David Hirschfelder – keyboards

References 

Dragon (band) songs
1988 singles
1988 songs
Songs written by Todd Hunter